Graysville is an unincorporated community in eastern Putnam County, in the U.S. state of Missouri.

The community is on Missouri Route 149. Unionville is approximately eleven miles to the west.

History
A post office called Graysville was established in 1875, and remained in operation until 1906. The community has the name of one Mr. Gray, who was credited with securing a post office for the town.

References

Unincorporated communities in Putnam County, Missouri
Unincorporated communities in Missouri